Cerithiopsis floridana is a species of sea snail, a gastropod in the family Cerithiopsidae, which is known from the Gulf of Mexico. It was described by Dall in 1892.

References

floridana
Gastropods described in 1892